Battalion, in comics, may refer to:

Battalion (DC Comics),  Alexander Lyons, a member of Team Titans, an alternative universe version of the Teen Titans
Battalion (WildStorm), a.k.a. Jackson King, superhero from the Wildstorm Universe, usually connected with incarnations of Stormwatch
V-Battalion, a fictional organisation in the Marvel Universe

See also
Battalion (disambiguation)